Hague is a small rural town in Saskatchewan, Canada, located approximately 47 kilometers north of Saskatoon. Hague was established in the late nineteenth century as a Mennonite community farming the fertile land in the area.

Hague is growing due to its relatively low cost of living compared to Saskatoon. However, the town's connection to the farming community remains strong. It has a school, arena (with hockey and curling), grocery store, hardware store, Credit Union, post office, one restaurant, two gas stations, and a vehicle dealership named Valley Ford. Construction on Highway 11 North was completed July 2011, twinning the Highway between Hague and Saskatoon.

History
Hague was first settled by farmers in the late 1800s and early 1900s. Actor Al Hubbs was born in Hague in 1931.

Demographics 

Climate

Hockey
NHL player Robyn Regehr wrote a letter to the NHLPA's Goals & Dreams program. Hague received $30,000 which was used to purchase a new ice re-surfacer.

References

External links

Rosthern No. 403, Saskatchewan
Towns in Saskatchewan
Division No. 15, Saskatchewan
Mennonitism in Saskatchewan